The 2002 Toronto Phantoms season is the 6th season for the franchise, their second season in Toronto. The Phantoms finished the regular season with a 5–9 record, and missed the playoffs.

Standings

Regular season schedule

References

External links
 

Toronto Phantoms
Toronto Phantoms seasons
Toronto Phantoms